Stefano Sculco (1638 – 9 November 1703) was a Roman Catholic prelate who served as Bishop of Gerace (1670–1686).

Biography
Stefano Sculco was born in Papanice, Crotone, Italy in 1638.
On 22 December 1670, he was appointed during the papacy of Pope Clement X as Bishop of Gerace.
On 4 January 1671, he was consecrated bishop by Marcello Santacroce, Bishop of Tivoli, Pier Antonio Capobianco, Bishop Emeritus of Lacedonia, and Andrea Tamantini, Bishop of Cagli, serving as co-consecrators. 
He served as Bishop of Gerace until his death on 20 April 1686. 
He died on 9 November 1703.

References

External links and additional sources
  (for Chronology of Bishops) 
  (for Chronology of Bishops) 

People from Crotone
17th-century Italian Roman Catholic bishops
Bishops appointed by Pope Clement X
1638 births
1703 deaths